The San Pasqual Band of Diegueño Mission Indians of California is a federally recognized tribe of Kumeyaay people, who are sometimes known as Mission Indians.

Reservation
The San Pasqual Reservation is a federal reservation, located in northeastern San Diego County, California, near Valley Center. It is made up of five, non-contiguous parcels of land that total . The original reservation, founded in 1910, is now the San Diego Zoo Safari Park and Lake Wolford. Reservation population is approximately 752, and 435 tribal members live in the general area. 21 people of 214 enrolled members lived there in the 1970s.

Government
The San Pasqual Band is headquartered in Valley Center. They are governed by a democratically elected tribal council. Allen E. Lawson is their current tribal chairperson.

Economic development
The tribe owns and operates the Valley View Casino, Black and Blue Steakhouse, The Buffet, BLD's Cafe, Mainstage Bar, Scoops Gelateria, and Sweets Coffee Shop, all located in Valley View. The tribe also maintains and owns the Woods Valley Golf Course as an enterprise of San Pasqual.

Education
The reservation is served by the Valley Center Union Elementary School District and the Escondido Union High School District.

Notes

References
 Eargle, Jr., Dolan H. California Indian Country: The Land and the People. San Francisco: Tree Company Press, 1992. .
 Pritzker, Barry M. A Native American Encyclopedia: History, Culture, and Peoples. Oxford: Oxford University Press, 2000. .
 Shipek, Florence C. "History of Southern California Mission Indians." Handbook of North American Indians. Volume ed. Heizer, Robert F. Washington, DC: Smithsonian Institution, 1978. 610-618. .

External links
San Pasqual Band of Diegueno Mission Indians, official website

Kumeyaay
California Mission Indians
Native American tribes in San Diego County, California
Native American tribes in California
Federally recognized tribes in the United States